In algebraic geometry, a Kummer quartic surface, first studied by , is an irreducible nodal surface of degree 4 in   with the maximal possible number of 16 double points. Any such surface is the Kummer variety of the Jacobian variety of a smooth hyperelliptic curve of genus 2; i.e. a quotient of the Jacobian by the Kummer involution x ↦ −x. The Kummer involution has 16 fixed points: the 16 2-torsion point of the Jacobian, and they are the 16 singular points of the quartic surface. 
Resolving the 16 double points of the quotient of a (possibly nonalgebraic) torus by the Kummer involution gives a K3 surface with 16 disjoint rational curves; these K3 surfaces are also sometimes called Kummer surfaces.

Other surfaces closely related to Kummer surfaces include Weddle surfaces, wave surfaces, and tetrahedroids.

Geometry of the Kummer surface

Singular quartic surfaces and the double plane model 
Let  be a quartic surface with an ordinary double point p, near which K looks like a quadratic cone. Any projective line through p then meets K with multiplicity two at p, and will therefore  meet the quartic K in just two other points.
sending q ≠ p ↦ , and any line in the tangent cone of p in K to itself. The ramification locus of the double cover is a plane curve C of degree 6, and all the nodes of K which are not p map to nodes of C.

By the genus degree formula, the maximal possible number of nodes on a sextic curve is obtained when the curve is a union of  lines, in which case we have 15 nodes. Hence the maximal number of nodes on a quartic is 16, and in this case they are all simple nodes (to show that  is simple project from another node). A quartic which obtains these 16 nodes is called a Kummer Quartic, and we will concentrate on them below.

Since  is a simple node, the tangent cone to this point is mapped to a conic under the double cover. This conic is in fact tangent to the six lines (w.o proof). Conversely, given a configuration of a conic and six lines which tangent to it in the plane, we may define the double cover of the plane ramified over the union of these 6 lines.

The double plane and Kummer varieties of Jacobians 
Starting from a smooth curve  of genus 2, we may identify the Jacobian 
with  under the map . We now observe two facts: Since  is a hyperelliptic curve the map from the symmetric product
Moreover, the canonical map  is a double cover. Hence we get a double cover .

The conic is isomorphic to the canonical system via the isomorphism , and each of the six lines is naturally isomorphic to the dual canonical system  via the identification of theta divisors and translates of the curve . There is a 1-1 correspondence between pairs of odd symmetric theta divisors and 2-torsion points on the Jacobian given by the fact that , where  are Weierstrass points  (which are the odd theta characteristics in this in genus 2). Hence the branch points of the canonical map  appear on each of these copies of the canonical system as the intersection points of the lines and the tangency points of the lines and the conic.

Finally, since we know that every Kummer quartic is a Kummer variety of a Jacobian of a hyperelliptic curve, we show how to reconstruct Kummer quartic surface directly from the Jacobian of a genus 2 curve: The Jacobian of  maps to the complete linear system  (see the article on Abelian varieties).

The quadric line complex

Level 2 structure

Kummer's 166 configuration 
There are several crucial points which relate the geometric, algebraic, and combinatorial aspects of the configuration of the nodes of the kummer quartic:

This theta divisor contains six 2-torsion points:  such that  is a Weierstrass point.
 The translation of the Jacobian by a two torsion point is an isomorphism of the Jacobian as an algebraic surface, which maps the set of 2-torsion points to itself.
Moreover, this complete linear system is invariant under shifts by 2-torsion points.

This configuration is called the  configuration or the Kummer configuration.

The Weil Pairing 
The 2-torsion points on an Abelian variety admit a symplectic bilinear form called the Weil pairing. In the case of Jacobians of curves of genus two, every nontrivial 2-torsion point is uniquely expressed as a difference between two of the six Weierstrass points of the curve. The Weil pairing is given in this case by
. One can recover a lot of the group theoretic invariants of the group  via the geometry of the  configuration.

Group theory, algebra and geometry 
Below is a list of group theoretic invariants and their geometric incarnation in the 166 configuration.
 
 Polar lines
 Apolar complexes
 Klein configuration
 Fundamental quadrics
 Fundamental tetrahedra
 Rosenhain tetrads
 Adolph Göpel 1812-1847s

References 

 Reprinted in 

Complex surfaces
Algebraic surfaces